Organic Soul is the debut solo album by Kottonmouth Kings' frontman Daddy X. It was released on August 24, 2004, via Suburban Noize Records.  The nineteen-track record featured guest appearances from Smokin Scotty Dread, E-Mann, Dogboy, and Sky Blue. As of September 11, 2004 the album made it to #18 on the Billboard Top Internet albums.

Track listing

Personnel

Bass – Paul Ill (tracks: 7, 11, 16, 17), Scott Koziel (tracks: 1, 3 to 5, 8, 9, 13, 18)Bass, Keyboards – John Henry (14)Drums – Lou Dog (tracks: 10, 19)Drums, Percussion – Tom Brayton (tracks: 1, 3 to 5, 7 to 9, 11, 13, 16, 18)Executive-Producer – Daddy X, Kevin ZingerGuitar, Bass, Voice – Doug Carrion (tracks: 1 to 5, 7 to 9, 11, 13, 16 to 19)Guitar, Voice – Scott JensenKeyboards, Guitar, Horns – Brad Gordon (tracks: 1 to 5, 7 to 11, 13, 16 to 19)Mixed By, Engineer – Patrick "P-Nice" ShevelinProducer – Brad Gordon (tracks: 10 to 19), Daddy X, Doug CarrionTurntables – DJ Bobby B (tracks: 2, 16, 17)Voice – Ricky Vodka (tracks: 1, 3 to 5, 9, 13, 18)

References

External links

2004 debut albums
Daddy X albums